Vincent Spadea was the defending champion, but lost in the semifinals. Wayne Arthurs won the title, defeating Mario Ančić 7–5, 6–3 in the final.

Seeds

  Tommy Haas (withdrew because of the flu)
  Vincent Spadea (semifinals)
  Mario Ančić (final)
  Taylor Dent (first round)
  Kevin Kim (second round)
  Irakli Labadze (second round)
  Kenneth Carlsen (first round)
  Lars Burgsmüller (second round)

Draw

Finals

Top half

Bottom half

External links
 Main draw
 Qualifying draw

Singles